The Lost Dog is a 2007 novel by Australian writer Michelle de Kretser.

Plot
Tom Loxley is holed up in a remote bush shack trying to finish his book on Henry James when his beloved dog goes missing. What follows is a triumph of storytelling, as The Lost Dog loops back and forth in time to take the reader on a spellbinding journey into worlds far removed from the present tragedy.

Awards
Commonwealth Writers Prize, South East Asia and South Pacific Region, Best Book, 2008: shortlisted 
Barbara Jefferis Award, 2008: shortlisted 
New South Wales Premier's Literary Awards, Christina Stead Prize for Fiction, 2008: winner 
New South Wales Premier's Literary Awards, Book of the Year, 2008: winner 
Australian Literature Society Gold Medal, 2008: winner 
Man Booker Prize, 2008: longlisted 
Victorian Premier's Literary Award, Vance Palmer Prize for Fiction, 2008: shortlisted
Australia-Asia Literary Award, 2008: longlisted

Reviews
Reviewing the novel for The New Statesman, Jane Shilling noted: "Reading The Lost Dog, one is torn between contradictory urges - to race ahead, in order to find out what happens, and to linger in admiration of de Kretser's ravishing style."

In The Guardian, Carmen Callil stated her opinion upfront: "This is my favourite kind of novel. It is full of incident and character, tells a gripping story, has many touches of brilliance and can make you laugh and wonder. But it is also mightily flawed...These lapses aside, the language is full of light, colour and precise observation and, better still, the author can handle ethical and political concerns with a light touch."

Interviews
 Robert Dessaix on ABC Radio National's The Book Show from November 2007.
 Fiona Gruber interview in The Sydney Morning Herald from November 2007.
 Rosemary Neill interview in The Australian from March 2008.
In conversation with Gail Jones at the 2008 Sydney Writers' Festival in May 2008.

References

2007 Australian novels
2007 in Australia
Novels set in Melbourne
ALS Gold Medal winning works